The Liberty Bell Museum (also the Liberty Bell Shrine Museum) is a non-profit organization and museum located in Zion's United Church of Christ (formerly Zion's Reformed Church) in Allentown, Pennsylvania in the Lehigh Valley region of eastern Pennsylvania. The museum is based in the church in which the Liberty Bell, an iconic and globally-recognized symbol of America's independence, was hidden from the British Army by Allentown-area American patriots during the American Revolutionary War from September 1777 to June 1778.

The museum was constructed and opened in 1962 and contains exhibits relating to the Liberty Bell and subjects including liberty, freedom, patriotism and local history. It also contains a full-size replica of the Liberty Bell, one of 55 replicas cast in France in 1950 for a U.S. Treasury savings bond promotion, which visitors are permitted to ring. Also on display is Allentown's Liberty Bell, which was cast in 1769 for Zion's Reformed Church and is believed to have been rung on July 8, 1776 to announce the public reading in Allentown of the Declaration of Independence.

Zion's Church, built in 1886 to replace the former church on the site, is one of 14 structures in Allentown listed on the National Park Service's National Register of Historic Places; however, the federal law that created the registry provides no protection against actions taken by property owners. The shrine was founded in 1962 by Ralph H. Griesemer and Morgan D. Person.

History

After General George Washington's and the Continental Army's defeat at the Battle of Brandywine on September 11, 1777, the revolutionary capital of Philadelphia was defenseless, and the city prepared for what was seen as an inevitable British attack on the city. Pennsylvania's Supreme Executive Council ordered that eleven bells, including the State House bell and the bells from Christ Church and St. Peter's Church in Philadelphia, be taken down and removed from the city to prevent the British Army from taking possession of them and melting them down to cast into munitions for use in the war. A train of over 700 wagons, guarded by 200 cavalry from North Carolina and Virginia under command of Colonel Thomas Polk of the 4th Regiment North Carolina Continental Line, left Philadelphia for Bethlehem, Pennsylvania in the Lehigh Valley with the bells hidden in the manure and hay. The State House Bell was hidden in the wagon of Northampton County militia private John Jacob Mickley. On September 18, the entourage and its armed escort arrived in Richland Township (present-day Quakertown).

On September 23, 1777, the bishop of the Moravian Church in Bethlehem reported that the wagons had arrived, and all bells except the State House bell had been moved to Northampton Towne in present-day Allentown. The following day, the State House bell was transferred to the wagon of Frederick Leaser and taken to the historic Zion Reformed Church in center city Allentown, where it was stored (along with the other bells), under the church's floorboards. Three days after the Liberty Bell's arrival in Bethlehem, on September 26, 1777, British forces marched into Philadelphia unopposed and occupied the city. The bell was later returned to Philadelphia in June 1778 following the end of the British occupation of Philadelphia.

On November 19, 1908, the Liberty Bell Chapter of the Daughters of the American Revolution unveiled the Saving of the Liberty Bell Plaque, describing the efforts of Mickley and Leaser, at Zion Reformed Church in Allentown.

On January 11, 2022, Zion's Consistory, the church's governing body, announced plans to put the church up for sale in late 2022 because of "declining membership and financial problems related to the COVID-19 pandemic." While the announcement did not indicate how the potential sale might impact the future of the Liberty Bell Museum, a consistory spokesperson indicated that preserving the museum was the church's "highest priority."

Allentown Flag Day Association 
The museum serves as the headquarters of the Allentown Flag Day Association, which was established on July 3, 1907 by local residents Joe Hart and General Harry Clay Trexler.  It is the oldest incorporated Flag Day Association in the United States.  The Association's most notable event occurred in 1922, when 50,000 people attended an event honoring General John J. Pershing with an award.

Pip the Mouse
In 2003, the Liberty Bell Museum became the permanent home of Pip the Mouse, a puppet that was part of the show, "The Mouse Before Christmas." The holiday show originally was performed at Hess's, a now-defunct local department store, from 1962 to 1995. The character of Pip became regionally famous among children and was a staple of the store's holiday advertising and marketing campaigns.

Gallery

See also
American Revolution
Liberty Bell
Liberty Bell Memorial Museum in Melbourne, Florida

References

Further reading
 Stoudt, John Baer The Liberty Bell in Allentown and Allentown's Liberty Bell, 1927. Issued in connection with the 150th anniversary of the bringing of the Liberty Bell to Allentown.
 Roberts, Charles Rhoads, History of Lehigh County, Pennsylvania, 1914. Early account of the hiding of the Liberty Bell in Allentown.

External links

Official website
Liberty Bell Church official website

1777 in the United States
American Revolutionary War museums in Pennsylvania
History of Allentown, Pennsylvania
History museums in Pennsylvania
Museums in Allentown, Pennsylvania
Pennsylvania in the American Revolution
Shrines